The University of East Sarajevo (abbr. UES) is a public university located in Lukavica, East Sarajevo, Republika Srpska, Bosnia and Herzegovina.

As of 2018–19 school year, there are 8,049 enrolled students.

According to SCImago Institutions Rankings, University of East Sarajevo is the best high school institution in Bosnia and Herzegovina.

History
It derived from the University of Sarajevo and was established in 1992 by the decision of the National Assembly of Republika Srpska.

It was recognized by the authorities in Republika Srpska as the successor of the University of Sarajevo (1949–1992 period) which ethnic Serb professors, staff and students decided to leave due to the Bosnian War. Serbs who left University of Mostar and University of Tuzla also participated in the establishment of institution. University is organized into 17 faculties at which student can select among 52 undergraduate and 42 graduate and postgraduate study programs. University is highly geographically decentralized and its faculties are located throughout the eastern half of Republika Srpska (Podrinje, Semberija and East Herzegovina) in the towns of Trebinje, Foča, Pale, East Sarajevo, Bijeljina, Zvornik and Doboj. It was first public university in Bosnia and Herzegovina to get higher education accreditation.

Partner universities

Serbia
 University of Niš
 University of Defence
 University of Arts in Belgrade

See also
 :Category:Academic staff of the University of East Sarajevo
 Education in Bosnia and Herzegovina
 List of split up universities
 List of universities in Bosnia and Herzegovina
 University of Priština (North Mitrovica)

References

1997 establishments in Bosnia and Herzegovina
Educational institutions established in 1997
Universities in Bosnia and Herzegovina
Education in the Republic of Srpska
University of East Sarajevo